Andreas Korte (born 23 March 1989) is a German footballer who plays as a defender.

References

External links

1989 births
Living people
People from Aachen (district)
Sportspeople from Cologne (region)
German footballers
Association football defenders
2. Bundesliga players
Alemannia Aachen players
Footballers from North Rhine-Westphalia